Roro Chu is a river in the Indian state of Sikkim that flows near Gangtok. It flows into the river Ranikhola at Ranipul. The combined river, known as Ranikhola, flows into the Teesta at Singtam.

Rivers of Sikkim
Rivers of India